Sándor Glancz (14 July 1908 in Budapest – 17 January 1974 in New York City) was a male international table tennis player from Hungary.

Table tennis career
From 1928 to 1934 he won several medals in singles, doubles, and team events in the Table Tennis European Championships.

His fourteen World Championship medals included four gold medals; one in the doubles at the 1933 World Table Tennis Championships with Viktor Barna and three in the team event.
He also won four English Open titles.

See also
 List of table tennis players
 List of World Table Tennis Championships medalists

References

1908 births
1974 deaths
Jewish table tennis players
Hungarian male table tennis players
Hungarian emigrants to the United States
Table tennis players from Budapest